The Stephens College South Campus Historic District is a national historic district on the campus of Stephens College in Columbia, Missouri. It includes the historic core of Stephens College in Eastern Downtown Columbia, Missouri.  The District includes Senior Hall, Hickman Hall, Columbia Hall, and Wood Hall.

The district was added to the National Register of Historic Places in 2005.

References

Stephens College
Historic districts on the National Register of Historic Places in Missouri
University and college buildings on the National Register of Historic Places in Missouri
Colonial Revival architecture in Missouri
Geography of Columbia, Missouri
National Register of Historic Places in Boone County, Missouri